The Red Hot Peppers were a New Zealand band formed in 1975 by Robbie Laven. The original members were Laven (who played multiple instruments including mandolin, ang klungs, congas, alto and baritone saxophone, flute, guitar, clarinet, fiddle, Glockenspiel, zither, banjo, harmonica, dobro and penny whistle), Marion Arts (vocals), Mike Farrell (guitar), Paul Baxter (bass guitar) who was replaced by Peter Kershaw, and Jim McMillan (drums) who was replaced by Vaughan Mayberry.

Discography

Albums

Toujours Yours (1976)

Tracklist

Credits
Bass – Paul Baxter
Drums – Jim McMillan
Flute – Robbie Laven
Guitar – Hans Laven, Robbie Laven
Lead Vocals – Marion Arts
Mandolin – Robbie Laven
Saxophone – Robbie Laven
Violin – Robbie Laven 
Engineer – Phil Yule

Bright Red (1977)
Produced by Ian McKenzie
 "Sing High, Sing Low" / Interlude: "Ottos Link" (by Laven and Arts)
 "Angel" (by Laven and Arts) / Interlude: "Salterello" (anon. arr. Laven)
 "Tears of Silver" (by Laven and Arts)
"Preacher Woman" (by Laven and Arts)
 "Heebie Jeebies" (by Gorney, Gray and Stothart)
 "You Can't Stop Bliss" / Interlude: "Abi Marijke" (by Laven and Arts)
"Sitting by the Road (Sighing)" (by Laven and Arts)
 "Summer Solace: Going up the Bush" (by Laven and Arts), "I've Just Seen a Face" (by Lennon and McCartney) and "Skylark" (by Maurice and Keegan)
 "Bright Red" (by Laven and Arts)

Stargazing (1978)
Tracklist

See also
Other bands with a similar name:
 Red Hot Chili Peppers
 Red Hot Peppers
Chilli Willi and the Red Hot Peppers

References

External links
 Some historical information and the band's evolution from the "1953 Memorial Rock 'n' Roll Band" to the "Red Hot Peppers"

New Zealand musical groups